The Affair is a 2019 Czech drama film directed by Julius Ševčík. It stars Hanna Alström, Karel Roden and Carice van Houten. It is based on The Glass Room, a novel by Simon Mawer, which tells the story of a fictional house based on the Ludwig Mies van der Rohe-designed Villa Tugendhat in Brno, Czech Republic, where the movie was filmed.

Plot
Wealthy newlyweds Liesel and Viktor have enlisted a famous architect, Rainer von Abt to build them a new home, which becomes the talk of 1930s Czechoslovakia. Liesel’s friend Hana is nursing seemingly unrequited romantic feelings for her pal, while Viktor is caught in the act with nanny Kata. On the eve of Nazi invasion, Liesel and Viktor flee to neutral Switzerland with their two children. Almost immediately, Liesel misses her friend and realises her feelings were more than platonic.

Cast

Reception
The film was nominated for Czech Lion Awards in 2019 for Best Cinematography, Stage Design, Makeup and Hairstyling, Costume Design, Music and Sound.

References

External links
 
 The Glass Room at CSFD.cz 

2019 films
Czech drama films
English-language Czech films
2019 drama films
2010s English-language films
Films based on British novels